2006 French Open mixed doubles was an event at the 2006 French Open.

Daniela Hantuchová and Fabrice Santoro were the defending champions, but Hantuchová chose not to participate that year. Santoro paired up alongside Amélie Mauresmo instead, but lost to eventual finalists Elena Likhovtseva and Daniel Nestor in the first round.

Katarina Srebotnik and Nenad Zimonjić won the final against Likhovtseva and Nestor with the score of 6-3, 6-4.

Schedule

Seeds

Draw

Finals

Top half

Bottom half

External links
2006 French Open – Doubles draws and results at the International Tennis Federation

Mixed Doubles
French Open by year – Mixed doubles